Renate in the Quartet is a 1939 German musical comedy film directed by Paul Verhoeven and starring Käthe von Nagy, Hans Brausewetter and Gustav Fröhlich. It is based on a novel by Geog Albrecht von Ihering. When a female violinist joins an otherwise all-male musical quartet, the other members struggle to cope.

Cast
 Käthe von Nagy as Renate Schmidt
 Hans Brausewetter as Peter Vogt
 Gustav Fröhlich as Kurt Kielmansdorf
 Attila Hörbiger as Michael Börne
 Anton Pointner as Räusperer
 Johannes Riemann as Walter Bauer
 Walter Gross as Varieté-Regisseur
 Harald Paulsen as Paul Erdmann
 Josef Dahmen as Musiker am Konservatorium
 Herma Relin as Hella Schütz
 Ingeborg von Kusserow as Li, Frau Ambergs Nichte
 Jac Diehl as Varieté-Angestellter
 Wolfgang Dohnberg as Varieté-Inspizient
 Reinhold Hauser as Gesundheitsprotz
 Ingolf Kuntze as Direktor des Konservatoriums
 Walter Lieck as Dr. N.
 Olga Limburg as Frau Amberg
 Heinz Müller as Direktionsmitglied im Varieté
 Franz Pfaudler as Wirt im Bahnhofsrestaurant
 Erika Raphael as Lo, Frau Ambergs Nichte
 Norbert Schultze as Dirigent am Konservatorium
 Maria Seidler as 2. Platzanweiserin
 Hilde Spies as Wirtin
 Franz Weber as Professor Klinger
 Klaus Pohl
 Theo Brandt

References

Bibliography

External links 
 

1939 films
Films of Nazi Germany
German musical comedy films
1939 musical comedy films
1930s German-language films
Films directed by Paul Verhoeven (Germany)
Films about musical groups
German black-and-white films
Tobis Film films
1930s German films